Dream Merchant Vol. 1 is the first compilation album from producer 9th Wonder, formerly of Little Brother.

It was released in 2005 through 6 Hole Records It is only physically available in a pack called National Mayhem which also contains the albums National Anthem by The Away Team and Project Mayhem by L.E.G.A.C.Y. It is also available to purchase the album from iTunes. The album is solely produced by 9th Wonder, the album features guest appearances by K. Hill, Joe Scudda, L.E.G.A.C.Y., Poohbear (now known as Rapper Big Pooh), Median, Phonte, Defcon (now known as Sean Boog), Yung, Love Joy, Logic, Chaundon, Keisha Shontelle, Crisis, Cesar Comanche & Kevikaze.

Track listing

"A Letter To Sick L (1980-2001)" (featuring K. Hill) - 4:57
"Just Don't Speak" (featuring Joe Scudda, L.E.G.A.C.Y. & Poohbear) – 4:34
"Median Alleviates the Drama" (featuring Median) – 3:19
"Speed" (featuring Phonte & Poohbear) – 4:02
"The U-Express" (featuring Defcon) – 2:27 
"My People" (featuring Yung, Love Joy & Logic) – 4:23
"Fallen" (featuring Chaundon) – 3:45
"Mr. Dream Merchant" (featuring Poohbear)– 2:48
"Almost Genuine" (featuring Defcon & Phonte) – 4:53
"Strained" (featuring Keisha Shontelle & Crisis) – 5:43
"Third Person" (featuring L.E.G.A.C.Y. – 3:51
"The Addiction" (featuring Defcon) – 2:45
"Like Dat" (featuring Phonte & Cesar Comanche) – 2:27 
"Soul Dojo" (featuring Kevikaze – 3:29
"The Righteous Way to Go (For the Jeeps) (Instrumental)" – 4:28
"Too Late" (featuring Phonte) – 2:42

External links
 Dream Merchant Vol.1 Album Snippets

2005 albums
9th Wonder albums
Albums produced by 9th Wonder
Albums produced by Khrysis